Escadron d'Hélicoptères 3/67 Parisis is a French Air and Space Force (Armée de l'air et de l'espace) Helicopter Squadron located at BA 107 Vélizy – Villacoublay Air Base, Yvelines, France which operates the Eurocopter Fennec.

The unit was established on 1 October 1964, taking the 'Parisis' name from a disbanded fighter squadron of the 10e Escadre de Chasse.

During the December 2013 the unit sent one Fennec to the Central African Republic as part of Operation Sangaris.

See also
 List of French Air and Space Force aircraft squadrons

References

French Air and Space Force squadrons
Helicopter units and formations
Military units and formations established in 1964